Gennadi Orbu is the name of:
 Ghenadie Orbu (born 1982), Moldovan international footballer
 Hennadiy Orbu (born 1970), Ukrainian international footballer